CAGI may refer to one of the following:

Compressed Air and Gas Institute
A variant of transliteration for TsAGI, Russian Central Aerohydrodynamic Institute
Critical Assessment of Genome Interpretation, an online biology community experiment